The 2016 Pan American Track Cycling Championships took place at the Velódromo Bicentenario, Aguascalientes, Mexico,  October 5–9, 2016.

Medal summary

Men

Women

Records
In addition to the women's 500m time trial world record, Pan American records were also set in the following events:
 Men's sprint (flying 200m time trial/qualifying round): 9"487 by Fabián Puerta
 Men's 1 km time trial: 59"135 by Santiago Ramírez
 Men's individual pursuit (bronze medal final): 4'13"007 by Edison Bravo
 Men's team sprint (gold medal final): 42"772 by Colombia (Ruben Murillo, Fabián Puerta and Santiago Ramírez)
 Men's team pursuit (gold medal final): 3'55"362 by Colombia (Juan Arango, Brayan Sánchez, Eduardo Estrada and Wilmar Paredes)
 Women's sprint (flying 200m time trial/qualifying round): 10"474 by Jessica Salazar
 Women's team sprint (qualifying round): 32"568 by Mexico (Jessica Salazar and Yuli Verdugo)

Medal table

Notes

References

Americas
Cycling
Pan American Road and Track Championships
International cycle races hosted by Mexico